The Amabiliidae are a family of tapeworms. It contains four genera and 23 species.
Amabilia
Joyeuxilepis
Laterorchites
Tatria

References 

Cestoda
Platyhelminthes families